Elisabeth Svoboda (born 7 October 1942) is an Austrian diver. She competed in two events at the 1964 Summer Olympics.

References

1942 births
Living people
Austrian female divers
Olympic divers of Austria
Divers at the 1964 Summer Olympics
Place of birth missing (living people)